Alain Providence (born 16 August 1982 in Micoud) is a Saint Lucian professional football manager.

Career
Since June 2010 until December 2011 he coached the Saint Lucia national football team.

References

External links

Profile at Soccerpunter.com

1982 births
Living people
Saint Lucian football managers
Saint Lucia national football team managers
People from Micoud Quarter